Koo Wee Rup  is a town and satellite suburb in Victoria, Australia, 63 km south-east of Melbourne's Central Business District, located within the Shire of Cardinia local government area. Built on former marshland now converted to market gardens, Koo Wee Rup recorded a population of 4,047 at the 2021 census.

Prior to December 1994 the suburb was part of the Shire of Cranbourne.

The post office opened on 7 January 1891.

In the early 1950s many Dutch and Italian families settled in the area. Prior to European settlement the area was occupied by the Bunurong Aboriginal people. It is from their language that the town's name derives. Ku-wirup is believed to mean "plenty of blackfish" or "blackfish swimming".

Koo Wee Rup is Australia's largest asparagus-growing district. It is also a beef-farming and potato-growing area. The town was previously well known for its potato festival, which was held each March to raise funds for the Westernport Memorial Hospital (now Kooweerup Regional Health Service).

Schools include Koo Wee Rup Primary School, St John the Baptist Primary School and Koo Wee Rup Secondary College.

The town has an Australian rules football team competing in the West Gippsland Football League.

Transport

Koo Wee Rup railway station was formerly situated on the South Gippsland railway line that operated as far as a terminus at Yarram in the 1970s, and was cut back to Leongatha in the early 1980s. A V/Line road coach service replaced the rail passenger service to Leongatha on 24 July 1993, running between Melbourne and Yarram. However, since the closure of the South Gippsland rail line by the Kennett state government on 14 December 1994, the South and West Gippsland Transport Group, represented by the local council, have campaigned for the rail service to be reinstated beyond its current terminus at Cranbourne by the 2020s, which had been promised by the Bracks government on its election in 1999.

Ventura Bus Lines operates a bus service from Koo Wee Rup to Pakenham on behalf of Public Transport Victoria.

Airport Proposal
In 2017, Koo Wee Rup was announced the proposed site for a third Melbourne airport. The Shire of Cardinia claimed it has been kept in the dark about an investment company's plan to build a $7 billion south-east airport; however, they urged the State Government to find a location for an airport in the area.

See also
 City of Cranbourne – Koo Wee Rup was previously within this former local government area.

References

External links

Koo-wee-rup (SMH Travel)

Towns in Victoria (Australia)
Shire of Cardinia